A confidence trick is an attempt to defraud a person or group after first gaining their trust. Confidence tricks exploit victims using their credulity, naïveté, compassion, vanity, confidence, irresponsibility, and greed. Researchers have defined confidence tricks as "a distinctive species of fraudulent conduct ... intending to further voluntary exchanges that are not mutually beneficial", as they "benefit con operators ('con men') at the expense of their victims (the 'marks')".

Terminology
Synonyms include con, confidence game, confidence scheme, ripoff, scam, and stratagem. The perpetrator of a confidence trick (or "con trick") is often referred to as a confidence (or "con") man, con-artist, or a "grifter". The shell game dates back at least to Ancient Greece.

William Thompson (1821–1856) was the original "confidence man". Thompson was a clumsy swindler who asked his victims to express confidence in him by giving him money or their watch rather than gaining their confidence in a more nuanced way. A few people trusted Thompson with their money and watches. Thompson was arrested in July 1849. Reporting about this arrest, James Houston, a reporter for the New York Herald, publicized Thompson by naming him the "Confidence Man". Although Thompson was an unsuccessful scammer, he gained the reputation as a genius operator mostly because Houston's satirical tone was not understood as such. The National Police Gazette coined the term "confidence game" a few weeks after Houston first used the name "confidence man".

A confidence trick is also known as a con game, a finesse, a con, a scam, a grift, a hustle, a bunko (or bunco), a swindle, a flimflam, a gaffle, or a bamboozle. The intended victims are known as marks, suckers, stooges, mugs, rubes, or gulls (from the word gullible). When accomplices are employed, they are known as shills.

Length
A short con or "small con" is a fast swindle which takes just minutes, possibly seconds. It typically aims to rob the victim of money or other valuables which they carry on their person or are guarding.

A "long con" or "big con" (also, chiefly ) is a scam that unfolds over several days or weeks; it may involve a team of swindlers, and even props, sets, extras, costumes, and scripted lines. It aims to rob the victim of huge sums of money or valuables, often by getting them to empty out banking accounts and borrow from family members.

Stages
In Confessions of a Confidence Man, Edward H. Smith lists the "six definite steps or stages of growth" of a confidence game. He notes that some steps may be omitted. It is also possible some can be done in a different order than the one shown or carried out simultaneously.

Foundation work
Preparations are made in advance of the game, including the hiring of any assistants required and studying the background knowledge needed for the role.
Approach
The victim is approached or contacted.
Build-up
The victim is given an opportunity to profit from participating in a scheme. The victim's greed is encouraged, such that their rational judgment of the situation might be impaired.
Pay-off or convincer
The victim receives a small payout as a demonstration of the scheme's purported effectiveness. This may be a real amount of money or faked in some way (including physically or electronically). In a gambling con, the victim is allowed to win several small bets. In a stock market con, the victim is given fake dividends.
The "hurrah"
A sudden manufactured crisis or change of events forces the victim to act or make a decision immediately. This is the point at which the con succeeds or fails. With a financial scam, the con artist may tell the victim that the "window of opportunity" to make a large investment in the scheme is about to suddenly close forever.
The in-and-in
A conspirator (in on the con, but assumes the role of an interested bystander) puts an amount of money into the same scheme as the victim, to add an appearance of legitimacy. This can reassure the victim, and give the con man greater control when the deal has been completed.

In addition, some games require a "corroboration" step, particularly those involving a fake, but purportedly "rare item" of "great value". This usually includes the use of an accomplice who plays the part of an uninvolved (initially skeptical) third party, who later confirms the claims made by the con man.

Vulnerability factors
Confidence tricks exploit  characteristics such as greed, dishonesty, vanity, opportunism, lust, compassion, credulity, irresponsibility, desperation, and naïvety. As such, there is no consistent profile of a confidence trick victim; the common factor is simply that the victim relies on the good faith of the con artist. Victims of investment scams tend to show an incautious level of greed and gullibility, and many con artists target the elderly and other people thought to be vulnerable, using various forms of confidence tricks. Researchers Huang and Orbach argue:

Accomplices, also known as shills, help manipulate the mark into accepting the perpetrator's plan. In a traditional confidence trick, the mark is led to believe that he will be able to win money or receive some benefits by doing some task. The accomplices may pretend to be strangers who have benefited from performing similar tasks in the past.

Online fraud 
Fraud has rapidly adapted to the Internet. The Internet Crime Complaint Center (IC3) of the FBI received 847,376 reports in 2021 with a reported loss of money of $ 6.9 billion in the US alone. The Global Anti Scam Alliance annual Global State of Scam Report, stated that globally $ 47.8 billion was lost and the number of reported scams increased from 139 million in 2019 to 266 million in 2020.

Government organizations have set up online fraud reporting websites to build awareness about online scams and help victims make reporting of online fraud easier. Examples are in the US (FBI IC3, Federal Trade Commission), Australia (ScamWatch  ACCC), Singapore (ScamAlert), United Kingdom (ActionFraud), Netherlands (FraudeHelpdesk). In addition, several private, non-profit initiatives have been set-up to combat online fraud like AA419 (2004), APWG (2004) and ScamAdviser (2012).

See also

References

Further reading

External links

 
  Confidence tricks in China.
 
  Lou Blonger was the head of a large gang of confidence men running the Big Con in 1910s Denver.
 

 
Deception
Psychological manipulation
Fraud
Crime
Organized crime activity